Champion of the World may refer to:

Holder of a World championship
"We Are the Champions", a 1977 song by the band, Queen
The Champion of the World, a short story by Roald Dahl later adapted into Danny, the Champion of the World
Champions of the World (TV series), an Indian cricket quiz show
The nineteenth chapter of I Know Why the Caged Bird Sings
The Champion of the World (1927 film), a German silent film
Champion of the World (2021 film), a Russian drama film
"Champion of the World" (song), a 2020 single by Coldplay